Early specifications for the International Phonetic Alphabet included cursive forms of the letters designed for use in manuscripts and when taking field notes. However, the 1999 Handbook of the International Phonetic Association said:There are cursive forms of IPA symbols, but it is doubtful if these are much in use today. They may have been of greater use when transcription by hand was the only way of recording speech, and so speed was essential. The cursive forms are harder for most people to decipher, and it is preferable to use handwritten versions which closely copy the printed form of the symbols.

Development

Example
The following passage is from the 1912 handbook:

See also
History of the International Phonetic Alphabet

References

International Phonetic Alphabet
Penmanship
Western calligraphy